Screener may refer to:

 Screener (promotional), an advance copy of a film or television episode
 Screener (website), an American movie and television listing website
 A person who engages in any kind of screening

See also 
 Quality control
 Screening (disambiguation)